Lacoste & Battmann, Lacoste et Battmann, was a French manufacturer of automobiles, based in Paris, from 1897 until 1913.

Company history
Jacques Lacoste founded the company J. Lacoste et Cie in Paris in 1897 for automobile production. In 1901 the name was changed to Lacoste & Battmann and 1905 in Lacoste & Battmann Ltd.

The company sold limited numbers of finished vehicles under its own name, and via its own marques: Cupelle (1905) and L & B. In addition finished chassis, equipped with Aster, De Dion-Bouton or Mutel engines, were supplied to competing companies such as : Gamage, Horley Motor & Engineering Co. Ltd (sold as Horley and No Name), Imperial, Jackson, Lacoba, E. H. Lancaster, Napoleon, Regal, Simplicia and Speedwell Motor & Engineering, which completed the chassis and bodywork to offer complete cars under their own names.

Production ended in 1913.

Vehicles 

 1897: 4 CV (4 hp) quadricycle with electric ignition.
 1903: 6 CV single-cylinder and 12 CV two-cylinder built -in engine from De Dion-Bouton as well as 24 CV four-cylinder engine from Mutel.
 1904: Single cylinder model with a displacement of 700 cm3
 1905: single-cylinder models, 10 CV two-cylinder with 2000 cm3 displacement and four-cylinder models with 2500 cm3, 3300 cm3 and 4900 cm3 displacement; Engines from Aster and De Dion-Bouton
 1906: 12/16 CV
 1907: One-, two- and four-cylinder models from 4.5 CV to 24 CV as well as electric cars
 1910: Four-cylinder model with a displacement of 1800 cm3, Aster engine

References

Defunct motor vehicle manufacturers of France
Manufacturing companies based in Paris
French companies established in 1897